Miss America 1974, the 47th Miss America pageant, was held at the Boardwalk Hall in Atlantic City, New Jersey on September 8, 1973, and broadcast on NBC.

The winner was Rebecca Ann King, whose daughter Diana Dreman would become Miss Colorado and a contender for Miss America 2012, the first daughter of a victorious Miss America to compete in the pageant.

Suzanne Plummer, second runner-up, is known today as Sue Lowden, who became chairperson of the Republican Party in Nevada and a 2010 U.S. Senate candidate there. Another contestant, Michelle Marshall of Missouri, is now the political analyst and blogger Taylor Marsh.

Results

Placements

Order of announcements

Top 10

Awards

Preliminary awards

Other awards

Judges
 Peter Lind Hayes
 Peggy Fleming
 Dr. Wellington B. Gray
 Lee Meriwether
 Vivienne della Chiesa
 Eileen Farrell
 Mary Healy
 Don Galloway
 Trudy Haynes
 Art Fleming

Contestants

External links
 Miss America official website

1974
1973 in the United States
1974 beauty pageants
1973 in New Jersey
September 1973 events in the United States
Events in Atlantic City, New Jersey